Az-Zainiya (pi-Solsel "the adornment") is a name given to two villages in the Luxor Governorate, Egypt – az-Zainiya Bahari (pi-Solsel Pemhit) and az-Zainiya Qibli (pi-Solsel Phres). The two villages were one of the last places where a colloquial Coptic language was spoken.

References 

Populated places in Luxor Governorate